Hugo Eduardo Villaverde (born 27 January 1954 in Santa Fe) is a retired Argentine football defender who played most of his career for Club Atlético Independiente. He holds the record in Argentina for most first division matches without scoring a goal, ahead of Jorge Titonell who in the 1930s and 40s played 405 matches for  Talleres (Remedios de Escalada) and Huracán.

Villaverde started his professional playing career in 1973 with home town club Colón de Santa Fe at the age of 19.

In 1975, he joined Independiente where he became a key player throughout the 1970s and 1980s. He won four league titles, the 1984 Copa Libertadores and Copa Intercontinental with the club.

Villaverde played for the Argentina national team in 1979, but never returned to the international scene after suffering an injury in friendly match against Scotland.

Villaverde's nephew, Alejandro "Papu" Gómez, is also a professional footballer who has played for the Argentina national team.

Honours
Independiente
 Primera División Argentina: 1977 Nacional, 1978 Nacional, 1983 Metropolitano, 1988–89
 Copa Libertadores: 1984
 Copa Intercontinental: 1984

References

External links
  

1954 births
Living people
Footballers from Santa Fe, Argentina
Argentine footballers
Argentina international footballers
Association football defenders
Club Atlético Colón footballers
Club Atlético Independiente footballers
Argentine Primera División players